The International Commission on the History of Geological Sciences (INHIGEO) promotes ongoing research into the history of the earth sciences, particularly the history of geology. It has 20 Honorary Senior Members and 301 members (2018) worldwide.

History 
INHIGEO has been established by the International Union of Geological Sciences (IUGS) and is also affiliated with the International Union of History and Philosophy of Science (IUHPS). The suggestion for the establishment of INHIGEO in 1967 was chiefly due to the ideas and efforts of the distinguished Russian geologist Vladimir Tikhomirov (1915–1994) from the Geological Institute of the USSR Academy of Sciences.

Board of Management
President:

 1967 —  — Vladimir Tikhomirov
 1976 —  — Reijer Hooykaas
 1984 —  — Gordon Y. Craig
 1989 —  — Martin Guntau
 1992 —  — David Branagan
 1996 —  — Hugh Torrens
 2000 —  — Manuel Serrano Pinto
 2004 —  — Philippe Taquet
 2008 —  — Silvia Fernanda de Mendonça Figueirôa
 2012 —  — Kenneth Taylor
 2016 —  — Barry Cooper
 2020 —  — Ezio Vaccari.

Secretary-General:

 1969 —  —  Kazimierz Maślankiewicz
 1976 —  —  Martin Guntau
 1984 —  —  Endre Dudich
 1989 —  —  Ursula Marvin
 1996 —  —  David Oldroyd
 2004 —  — Kennand Bork
 2008 —  — Barry Cooper
 2016 —  — Marianne Klemun
 2020 —  — Martina Kölbl-Ebert.

Objective 
The primary objective of the Commission on the History of Geological Sciences involves promoting studies in the history of geological disciplines. In so doing, the Commission
endeavours to stimulate and coordinate the activities of regional, national, and international organizations having shared purposes. The Commission also works to foster the publication of individual and collective works that illuminate the history of the geological sciences.

INHIGEO achieves its objective by sponsoring a major annual symposium with associated field activities. It also promotes publication of individual and collective works on the history of geology and issues a substantial "Annual Record" that details historical research into earth sciences worldwide, publicises other pertinent historical activities and provides scholarly reviews of recent literature on the subject.

Strategies 
 Meet with regularity, usually once a year, including years of the International Geological Congress, to conduct a major symposium on the history of geology. This typically
includes a multi-day field component, with the production by the Commission of printed guidebooks.
 Produce an annual Newsletter that incorporates information from the officers, national reports, book reviews, conference reports, and a variety of news items and illustrations that
promote sharing of professional insights.
 Make an effort to record the history of the International Geological Congress meetings and relevant IUGS activities.
 Work with various publishing houses and journals, including Episodes, to promote publication of symposia proceedings and a variety of contributions to the discipline.

Meetings 
INHIGEO Symposiums:

 1967 —  — Yerevan
 1968 —  — Prague (with 23rd IGC)
 1970 —  — Freiberg
 1972 —  — Montreal (with 24th IGC)
 1974 —  — Madrid
 1975 —  — London
 1976 —  — Sydney (with 25th IGC)
 1978 —  — Münster, Bonn
 1980 —  — Paris (with 26th IGC)
 1982 —  — Budapest
 1984 —  — Moscow (with 27th IGC)
 1985 —  — Edinburgh
 1987 —  — Pisa, Padova
 1989 —  — Washington, D.C. (with 28th IGC)
 1990 —  — Beijing
 1991 —  — Dresden
 1992 —  — Kyoto (with 29th IGC)
 1993 —  — San Paolo
 1994 —  — Sydney
 1995 —  — Naples
 1996 —  — Beijing (with 30th IGC)
 1997 —  — Liège
 1998 —  — Neuchatel
 1999 —  — Freiberg
 2000 —  — Rio de Janeiro (with 31st IGC)
 2001 —  — Lisbon
 2002 —  — Paris
 2003 —  — Dublin
 2004 —  — Florence (with 32nd IGC)
 2005 —  — Prague
 2006 —  — Vilnius
 2007 —  — Eichstätt
 2008 —  — Oslo (with 33rd IGC)
 2009 —  — Calgary
 2010 —  — Madrid
 2011 —  — Toyohashi
 2012 —  — Brisbane (with 34th IGC)
 2013 —  — Manchester
 2014 —  — Asilomar
 2015 —  — Beijing
 2016 —  — Cape Town (with 35th IGC)
 2017 —  — Yerevan
 2018 —  — Mexico City
 2019 —  — Varese, Como
 2021 —  — planned in New Delhi (with 36th IGC), canceled due to COVID-19
 2021 —  — Krakow
 2022 —  — Planned in Les Eyzies-de-Tayac-Sireuil
 2023 – Location to be decided
 2024 – , Busan (with 37th IGC), or planned in Japan.

Affiliated Associations 

List of the INHIGEO affiliated associations (2018)
 International — History of Earth Sciences Society (HESS)
 Argentina — Comisión Argentina de Historia de la Geología
 Australia — Earth Sciences History Group, Geological Society of Australia (ESHG)
 Austria — Austrian Working Group History of Earth Sciences (AWGHES)
 China — Committee on the History of Geology, Geological Society of China
 France — Comité Français d’histoire de la Géologie (COFRHIGEO)
 Italy — History of Geoscience Section Geological Society of Italy
 Japan — Japanese Association for the History of Geosciences (JAHIGEO)
 Poland — Section on the History of Geological Sciences Polish Geological Society
 Poland — Polish Geological Institute
 Serbia — History of Geology Division
 Serbian — Srpsko geološko društvo (SGD)
 UK — History of Geology Group (HOGG) Geological Society of London
 Venezuela — Sociedad Venezolana de Historia de las Geociencias.

Publications 
 Celebrating 50 Years of INHIGEO / Editors W. Mayer, R. M. Clary, L. F. Azuela, N. S. Mots, S. Wolkowicz. London: GSL, 2017. 456 p. (GSL Special Publication; 442).
 Program and guidebook. INHIGEO, 2017. Armenia.
 Physis: Rivista Internazionale di Storia della Scienza. 2021. Vol. 56. Fasc. 1/2. (The History of Geological Sciences as a disciplinary crossing point: the Proceedings of the INHIGEO 2019 Symposium)

References

External links
 inhigeo.com — Official website
 INHIGEO Symposiums official sites: 2019, 2017, 2015, 2014.

 University of New Hampshire.edu: "History of Geology on the International Scene" 
 'Episodes' — Journal of International Union of Geological Sciences.

History of Earth science
Commission on the History of Geological Sciences
Geology organizations
History of science organizations
Commission on the History of Geological Sciences
Scientific organizations established in 1967